Candeias is a municipality in Brazil, in the state of Bahia. The town is near the BR-324 motorway. The town has a current population of 87,458 (2020 estimate).

With the 6th-highest GDP in Bahia, its major economics activities are the port of Aratu which is one of the most important of the country. The town is based next to the second-biggest oil refinery of the country, Landulfo Alves refinery.

Its GDP is R$ 1,698,526,384 (US$ 1,081,863,939) and its HDI is 0.719.

Historic heritage sites

Candeias is home to four historic heritage sites, protected at either the federal or state level:

Freguesia Plantation, which now functions as the Wanderley Pinho Museum of the Recôncavo
Matoim Plantation
Church of Our Lady of the Incarnation of Passé
Candeias Oil Well (C-1)

While not under federal or state protection, the following sites are recognized by the Calouste Gulbenkian Foundation as part of the Património de Influência Portuguesa.

Chapel of Saint Antony of Pindobas
House of the São João Sugar Mill

References

Municipalities in Bahia
Populated coastal places in Bahia